Carmine Coppola (born 10 January 1979) is an Italian former professional footballer who played as a midfielder.

Club career
Coppola joined AlbinoLeffe in 2000 in co-ownership deal. In June 2001 AlbinoLeffe acquired the remain 50% registration rights from Vicenza. He then sold to Messina in 2001.

In January 2007, Coppola exchanged with Andrea Giallombardo on loan, making his Serie A debut in Livorno on 14 January against Atalanta. He then signed a new contract with the club. He was released after the bankrupt of Messina. He joined Serie B team Frosinone. He moved again in December on free transfer.

In August 2009 he terminated his contract with Salernitana, and joined Arezzo.

In January 2010 he left for Taranto. In July, he joined SPAL. In August 2011, he returned to Messina, a Serie D team.

International career
Coppola also appeared for the Italian national team in two friendly matches played in 2005 against Serbia and Montenegro and Ecuador.

References

External links
 

Italian footballers
Italy international footballers
A.S. Cittadella players
U.S. Triestina Calcio 1918 players
U.C. AlbinoLeffe players
A.C.R. Messina players
U.S. Livorno 1915 players
Frosinone Calcio players
U.S. Salernitana 1919 players
S.S. Arezzo players
Taranto F.C. 1927 players
Serie A players
Association football midfielders
Sportspeople from the Province of Naples
1979 births
Living people
Footballers from Campania